Herbert Hans Haupt (December 21, 1919 – August 8, 1942) was a spy and saboteur for Nazi Germany during World War II under Operation Pastorius.

Early life
Born in Stettin, Germany, Haupt was the son of Hans Max and Erna (Froehling) Haupt. Hans Haupt was a World War I Imperial German Army veteran who came to Chicago in 1923 to find work. His wife and son followed in 1925. Herbert Haupt became a United States citizen in 1930, at the age of 10, when his parents were naturalized. He attended Lane High School and later worked at the Simpson Optical Company as an apprentice optician. As a youth, Haupt was a member of the German American Bund's Junior League.

World War II
In 1941, Haupt, with two friends, Wolfgang Wergin and Hugo Troesken, set off on a world trek. Troesken was turned back at the Mexican border for lack of proper identification, but Haupt and Wergin continued. Neither Haupt nor Wergin had been able to secure American passports before the trip. As they were German born (and thus still considered by Germany to be its citizens), they secured German passports from the Embassy in Mexico City.

They sailed to Japan, where they found work on a German merchant ship bound for France. Haupt and Wergin arrived in France at the time of the Japanese attack on Pearl Harbor, following which Adolf Hitler had declared war against the United States. Now stranded in Europe, Haupt went to stay at his grandmother's home in Stettin. Wergin enlisted in the Wehrmacht.

As a civilian coast watcher, Haupt was awarded an Iron Cross for having helped his passenger ship run the British blockade when he served as a lookout on the way to France. This drew the attention of the Abwehr (Secret Service), which recruited him to return to America as a saboteur. Haupt later insisted he accepted the job only as a way to return home.

Operation Pastorius

Operation Pastorius consisted of 12 English-speaking Germans who were trained as secret agents at the Brandenburg Sabotage School. Eight eventually graduated and were sent to the United States via U-boat to try to damage the U.S. war industries. Haupt and three others landed on Ponte Vedra Beach, Florida on June 17, 1942. The remaining group landed on Long Island.

Haupt promptly took a train from Jacksonville to Chicago, where he stayed with his parents and visited his girlfriend. Haupt may well have intended to remain inactive until the end of the war. However, two members of the Long Island group, George John Dasch and Ernst Peter Burger, had almost immediately turned themselves in to American authorities, naming the other members of their teams. Haupt and his parents were arrested in Chicago on June 27.

Trial and death

Herbert Haupt and the other seven "U-boat Raiders" were sent to Washington, D.C., where they faced a military tribunal. All were found guilty of being spies, and even though they had not carried out any sabotage, six – including Haupt – were sentenced to death.  Dasch and Burger received long prison sentences, which were commuted to deportation after the war.

Haupt, Edward Kerling, Hermann Neubauer, Werner Thiel, Heinrich Heinck, and Richard Quirin were all executed on August 8, 1942 in the District of Columbia's electric chair. It was the largest mass execution by electrocution ever conducted at the District of Columbia jail.

Haupt broke down just before his execution, but witnesses say he recovered and proceeded to "die like a real man" in the electric chair. It took Haupt seven minutes to die in the chair. His last undelivered letter to his father read, "Try not to take this too hard. I have brought nothing but grief to all of my friends and relatives who did nothing wrong, my last thoughts will be of Mother."

Haupt was buried with the five others in the Potter's Field in Blue Plains, D.C. The graves were originally marked by wooden boards with numbers, but eventually a small monument was placed by the American Nazi Party over the graves in 1982. The marker went largely unnoticed until it was removed by the National Park Service in 2010.

Haupt's parents were convicted of treason and stripped of their citizenship for not informing on their son. Haupt's mother, Erna Haupt, was sentenced to 25 years in prison. Hans Haupt was sentenced to death. Four others were convicted in the same trial as Haupt's parents: Haupt's uncle, Walter Wilhelm Froehling, his aunt, Lucille Froehling, his friend, Otto Richard Wergin, his mother's friend, Kate Martha Wergin. Walter and Otto received death sentences, while Lucille and Kate received 25-year sentences. The judge who sentenced the group won praise around the country for the severity of the sentences.

The entire group later won trials due to technical errors. Walter and Otto later pleaded guilty to misprision of treason and received 5-year sentences. Hans Haupt was retried, found guilty of treason once more, but received a life sentence. Charges were dropped against Lucille and Kate, albeit Erna Haupt was held until the war ended and deported in 1948. In 1957, Hans Haupt was granted clemency by President Dwight D. Eisenhower and deported to Germany on the condition that he would never return to the United States.

Modern relevance 
In 2001, Herbert Haupt was in the news again as President Bush attempted to use military tribunals to try American citizens after the September 11, 2001, attacks. The Supreme Court ruling regarding Haupt, the only U.S. citizen executed in the affair, was cited again. (Ex parte Quirin)

See also 

 Capital punishment by the United States federal government
 List of people executed by the United States federal government

References

Sources 
They Came to Kill by Eugene Rachlis, 1961 Random House 
Shadow Enemies by Scott Gordon, 2002 Lyons Press 
Saboteurs, Nazi Raid on America, 2004 Alfred Knopf
In Time of War, by Pierce O'Donnell, 2005 The New Press

External links 
 Photograph of Haupt
 Story of Herbert Haupt
 Hans Max Haupt's appeal before the Supreme Court
 The Facts Don't Matter An hour-long This American Life radio episode (original air date 3/12/2004) about Haupt's life and the events leading up to Ex parte Quirin
 Washington Post

National Socialist Saboteurs Trial

1919 births
1942 deaths
Executed American collaborators with Nazi Germany
American people convicted of spying for Nazi Germany
People executed for spying for Nazi Germany
Executed German people
People from the Province of Pomerania
Recipients of the Iron Cross, 2nd class
Saboteurs
Nazis executed by the United States military by electric chair